The I–V–vi–IV progression is a common chord progression popular across several genres of music. It involves the I, V, vi, and IV chords of any particular musical scale. For example, in the key of C major, this progression would be: C–G–Am–F. Rotations include:
 I–V–vi–IV:C–G–Am–F
 V–vi–IV–I:G–Am–F–C
 vi–IV–I–V:Am–F–C–G
 IV–I–V–vi:F–C–G–Am
The '50s progression uses the same chords but in a different order (I–vi–IV–V), no matter the starting point.

Variations
A common ordering of the progression, "vi–IV–I–V", was dubbed the "sensitive female chord progression" by Boston Globe columnist Marc Hirsh. In C major this would be Am–F–C–G, modulating the key to A minor.

Hirsh first noticed the chord progression in the song "One of Us" by Joan Osborne, and then other songs. He named the progression because he claimed it was used by many performers of the Lilith Fair in the late 1990s. However, examples of the progression appeared in pop hits as early as the 1950s, such as in The Teddy Bears' "To Know Him Is to Love Him", written by Phil Spector.

Dan Bennett claims the progression is also called the "pop-punk progression" because of its frequent use in pop punk.

In this ordering, the progression ends with a double plagal cadence in the key of the dominant (in the Mixolydian mode) and could also be respelled ii–bVII–IV–I, opening with a backdoor turnaround.

The chord progression is also used in the form IV–I–V–vi, as in songs such as "Umbrella" by Rihanna and "Down" by Jay Sean. Numerous bro-country songs followed the chord progression, as demonstrated by Greg Todd's mash-up of several bro-country songs in an early 2015 video.

A 2009 song by the comedy group The Axis of Awesome, called "Four Chords", demonstrated the ubiquity of the progression in popular music, for comic effect; for instance, as the progression is played as a ostinato, sometimes it is used as a vi–IV–I–V (i. e. the "pessimistic" inversion). It does not accurately represent the chord progressions of all the songs it depicts. It was originally written in D major (thus the progression being D major, A major, B minor, G major) and performed live in the key of E major (thus using the chords E major, B major, C# minor, and A major). The song was subsequently published on YouTube. As of May 2020, the two most popular versions have been viewed over 100 million times combined.

The British progressive rock band Porcupine Tree made a song called "Four Chords That Made A Million" that appears to be a satire of the broad use of this progression in contemporary commercial music.

I–V–VII–IV

I–V–VII–IV may be viewed as a variation of I–V–vi–IV, replacing the submediant with the subtonic. It consists of two IV chord progressions, the second a whole step lower (A–E–G–D = I–V in A and I–V in G), giving it harmonic drive. There are few keys in which one may play the progression with open chords on the guitar, so it is often portrayed with barre chords ("Lay Lady Lay"). The use of the flattened seventh may lend this progression a bluesy feel or sound, and the whole tone descent may be reminiscent of the ninth and tenth chords of the twelve bar blues (V–IV). The progression also makes possible a chromatic descent across a minor third: –––.

"(You Make Me Feel Like) A Natural Woman" by Carole King make prominent use of this progression in its verses.  "Lay Lady Lay" uses the similar progression I–iii–VII–ii; the second and fourth chords are replaced by the relative minor while preserving the same ––– descent. This progression is used in other songs including "Turning Japanese" (1980) by The Vapors, "Sample in a Jar" (1994) by Phish (I–iii–VII–IV), "Waterfalls" (1995) by TLC, and "Don't Tell Me" (2000) by Madonna. "Cinnamon Girl" (1969) by Neil Young uses I–v–VII–IV (all in Mixolydian). It opens the verse to "Brown Eyes" by Lady Gaga, is used in the chorus to "Rio" (1982) by Duran Duran and "Sugar Hiccup" (1983) by the Cocteau Twins, and is in the 2nd part of the bridge in "Sweet Jane" (1988) by the Cowboy Junkies. John Maus uses a i-v-VII-iv in c minor for the verse of “Cop Killer”. The progression is also used entirely with minor chords[i-v-vii-iv (g#, d#, f#, c#)] in the middle section of Chopin's etude op. 10 no. 12. However, using the same chord type (major or minor) on all four chords causes it to feel more like a sequence of descending fourths than a bona fide chord progression. I–IV–VII–IV is a similar chord progression which is arch formed (I–IV–VII–IV–I), and has been used in the chorus to "And She Was" (1985) by Talking Heads, in "Let's Go Crazy" (1984) by Prince, in "Like a Rock" (1986) by Bob Seger, and in "Steady, As She Goes" (2006) by The Raconteurs (minor tonic: i–V–VII–IV).

Songs using the progression

This is a list of recorded songs containing multiple, repeated uses of the I–V–vi–IV progression.

See also
 Roman numeral analysis
 "The Complexity of Songs"
 '50s progression
 IV△7–V7–iii7–vi progression – the equivalent chord progression in contemporary Japanese music

References

Further reading

External links
 

Chord progressions